Pseudypsia is a monotypic moth genus of the family Erebidae. Its only species, Pseudypsia dilectata, is found in Ecuador. Both the genus and species were first described by Paul Dognin in 1900.

References

Calpinae
Monotypic moth genera